Wang Jiaqi (born 26 December 2001) is a Chinese footballer currently playing as a midfielder for Sichuan Jiuniu.

Career statistics

Club
.

References

2001 births
Living people
Chinese footballers
Association football midfielders
China League One players
Sichuan Jiuniu F.C. players